Joseph Francis Evers (September 10, 1891 – January 4, 1949) was a pinch runner in Major League Baseball. He appeared in one game for the New York Giants in 1913. His brother was Hall of Famer Johnny Evers. In addition to his very brief appearance in the Majors, he was a second baseman in the minor leagues from 1913 to 1924, spending half his career in Terre Haute, Indiana.  He was a player/manager for the 1917 Richmond Quakers of the Central League.

References

External links

1891 births
1949 deaths
New York Giants (NL) players
Baseball players from New York (state)
Sportspeople from Troy, New York
Minor league baseball managers
Terre Haute Terre-iers players
Dubuque Dubs players
Terre Haute Highlanders players
Muskegon Reds players
Richmond Quakers players
Cedar Rapids Rabbits players
Peoria Tractors players
Elmira Colonels players
Montpelier Goldfish players
Burials at St. Agnes Cemetery